Emily Atkin is an environmental reporter and writer, best known for founding the daily climate newsletter HEATED. She also launched a podcast by the same name to explore the intersectional issues highlighted by the COVID-19 pandemic.

Previously she was a reporter for The New Republic and ThinkProgress. She is a contributor to the anthology All We Can Save, edited by Ayana Elizabeth Johnson and Katharine K. Wilkinson, and a columnist at MSNBC.

Atkin was raised in New York, and went to school at State University of New York at New Paltz for journalism.

References

External links
The Heated Newsletter
The Heated Podcast

Year of birth missing (living people)
Living people
American women journalists
Climate communication
Environmental journalists
State University of New York at New Paltz alumni
21st-century American women